Zamalek Tennis Table Club, commonly known as Zamalek S.C, often referred to as) is one of Zamalek SC club's sections that represent the club in Egypt and international Table tennis competitions, the club team section based in Giza.

Honors

National titles

 Egyptian Table Tennis League
 Winners (10 titles): 1986-87  ,1987-88, 1989-90, 1994-95, 1999-2000, 2000-01, 2001-02, 2004-05, 2005-06, 2008-09

Regional titles

 Arab table tennis championship
 Winners (4 titles): 1991, 2001, 2005, 2006

See also 
Zamalek SC
Zamalek SC Handball
Zamalek SC Volleyball
Zamalek SC Basketball

References

Table tennis clubs
1955 establishments in Egypt
Sports clubs established in 1955